Keith England (born 27 February 1964), also known by the nickname of "Beefy", is a former professional rugby league footballer who played in the 1980s and 1990s.

Background
Keith England's birth was registered in Pontefract, West Riding of Yorkshire, England.

Playing career

International honours
Keith England won caps for Great Britain while at Castleford in 1987 in the 1985 - 1988 Rugby League World Cup against France, in 1987 against France, in 1989 against France, in 1989 in the 1989–1992 Rugby League World Cup against New Zealand, in 1990 against France, and Papua New Guinea, in 1990 in the 1989–1992 Rugby League World Cup against Papua New Guinea, in 1990 against New Zealand (2 matches), in 1990 in the 1989–1992 Rugby League World Cup against New Zealand, and in 1991 against France.

Challenge Cup Final appearances
Keith England left-, i.e. number 11, in Castleford's 15-14 victory over Hull Kingston Rovers in the 1986 Challenge Cup Final during the 1985–86 season at Wembley Stadium, London on Saturday 3 May 1986, and played right-, i.e. number 10, and scored a try in the 12-28 defeat by Wigan in the 1992 Challenge Cup Final during the 1991–92 season at Wembley Stadium, London on Saturday 2 May 1992, in front of a crowd of 77,386.

County Cup Final appearances
Keith England played  in Castleford's 2-13 defeat by Hull F.C. in the 1983 Yorkshire County Cup Final during the 1983–84 season at Elland Road, Leeds on Saturday 15 October 1983, played  in the 18-22 defeat by Hull Kingston Rovers in the 1986 Yorkshire County Cup Final during the 1986–87 season at Headingley Rugby Stadium, Leeds on Sunday 27 October 1985, did not play the 12-12 draw with Bradford Northern in the 1987 Yorkshire County Cup Final during the 1987–88 season at Headingley Rugby Stadium, Leeds on Saturday 17 October 1987, played right-, i.e. number 12, (replaced by interchange/substitute Giles Boothroyd) in the 2-11 defeat by Bradford Northern in the 1987 Yorkshire County Cup Final replay during the 1987–88 season at Elland Road, Leeds on Saturday 31 October 1987, played right-, i.e. number 10, in the 12-33 defeat by Leeds in the 1988 Yorkshire County Cup Final during the 1988–89 season at Elland Road, Leeds on Sunday 16 October 1988, played as an interchange/substitute, i.e. number 14, (replacing  Gary Atkins) in the 11-8 victory over Wakefield Trinity in the 1990 Yorkshire County Cup Final during the 1990–91 season at Elland Road, Leeds on Sunday 23 September 1990, and was an interchange/substitute, i.e. number 15, in the 28-6 victory over Bradford Northern in the 1991 Yorkshire County Cup Final during the 1991–92 season at Elland Road, Leeds on Sunday 20 October 1991.

References

External links
!Great Britain Statistics at englandrl.co.uk (statistics currently missing due to not having appeared for both Great Britain, and England)

1964 births
Living people
Castleford Tigers players
English rugby league players
Great Britain national rugby league team players
Rugby league players from Pontefract
Rugby league props
Rugby league second-rows